Al Shabab Al Arabi may refer to:

Al Shabab Al Arabi Club Beirut, Lebanese association football club
Al Shabab Al Arabi Club Dubai, Emirati former association football club